There are many roads in the southwestern part of British Columbia and Vancouver Island that were designated as Highway 1A.  These roads were sections of the original 1941 route of Highway 1 before its various re-alignments, and are used today as service routes and frontage roads. The "B.C. Highway 1A" designations were removed from these sections by the province between 2005 and 2010, although signage remains along some of the route and the designation on some maps.

Vancouver Island

North Cowichan 

Chemainus Road and Highway 1A turns northwest, and goes for  through Chemainus to the intersection with Roland Lane, where it subsequently turns west to meet the Trans-Canada Highway on the south end of Ladysmith. This route was the original Island Highway prior to the opening of the existing Trans-Canada Highway, which was constructed to bypass the Chemainus area in 1950.

Greater Victoria 

Since 1941, Highway 1A went from Victoria to Kelsey Bay, ending at the wharf. By 1960, Highway 1 ended at Nanaimo's Departure Bay Ferry terminal.

A 16 km (10 mi) long segment of highway in Greater Victoria was designated as Highway 1A. It started in Victoria at the intersection of Hillside Avenue and Government Street, following Gorge Road West for 5 km (3 mi) until it reached an intersection at Admirals Road, and crossed the Craigflower Bridge. Highway 1A then proceeded west along the Old Island Highway for 5 km (3 mi) to Goldstream Avenue. Highway 1A continued onto Goldstream Avenue and proceeded west through downtown Langford for 6 km (4 mi) to its termination at Highway 1 just short of Goldstream Provincial Park. This route was the original Island Highway prior to the opening of the existing Trans-Canada Highway route in 1955 and 1956.

Lower Mainland 

Until the Highway 1 Freeway (originally the "401") was built in the mid 1960s, much of the Fraser Highway was part of the Trans-Canada Highway. It was built along the route of Old Yale Road, which was first built in 1874 between Yale and New Westminster. The Fraser Highway route was designated as Highway 1 from 1941 to 1972 while the new freeway was designated as Highway 401 until 1972. In 1973, the freeway route became Highway 1 while the Fraser Highway became Highway 1A. In 2006, Highway 1A was decommissioned between Downtown Vancouver and Abbotsford, with a  segment of Highway 1A between West Vancouver and Vancouver remaining, but concurrent with Highway 99 for its entirety; the 1A designation was eventually deemed redundant and dropped in 2016.

Route description 
Highway 1A began at Highway 1 (Exit 13) in West Vancouver and shared the alignment with Highway 99 along Taylor Way, Marine Drive, the Lions Gate Bridge and the Stanley Park Causeway through Stanley Park to Georgia Street the West End and Downtown Vancouver. The route followed the Georgia Viaduct out of downtown to Main Street (westbound traffic used Dunsmuir Street) to Main Street. It then followed Kingsway through East Vancouver and Burnaby to New Westminster, where it followed 10th Avenue (which forms the boundary between Burnaby and New Westminster) and McBride Boulevard. It crossed the Fraser River along the Pattullo Bridge into Surrey, where the roadway became the King George Highway (renamed King George Boulevard in 2009). Highways 1A and 99A diverged with Highway 1A following the Fraser Highway southeast intersecting Highway 15 before reaching Highway 10 in Langley. Highway 1A briefly left Fraser Highway (which passes through downtown Langley), following the Langley Bypass and a short concurrency with Highway 10 to Glover Road, before rejoining Fraser Highway. Highway 1A continued southeast to Highway 13 at Aldergrove (in Langley Township), and continued into Abbotsford where it terminated at Highway 1 (Exit 83), just east of Mount Lehman Road.

With the decommissioning of the Highway 1A designation, the original Trans-Canada Highway route is now known merely as the Fraser Highway between Surrey to Abbotsford. The province of British Columbia still has a  section of the Fraser Highway between Highway 15 and Highway 13 in its highway inventory; however the route is maintained by TransLink.

Major intersections 

Footnotes

Chilliwack 

The Chilliwack-Rosedale Yale Road East section ran from the Trans-Canada Highway at the Vedder Road crossing (Exit 119), through Chilliwack and Rosedale, and reconnecting to the Trans-Canada Highway along with Highway 9 (Exit 135). This section of what was originally the Yale Road was part of the original Trans-Canada Highway route until the completion of the "401" Freeway section in the 1960s.  In 2005, the City of Chilliwack posted signage along the Yale Road East section designating it as the "Trans-Canada Parallel Route".

Kicking Horse Pass 

A former section of Highway 1A exists along the former Kicking Horse Trail, the original road between Lake Louise and Golden that opened in 1926. When the Trans-Canada Highway was realigned in 1962, the segment became Highway 1A. The route is now closed to vehicle traffic and is part the Great Divide hiking trail.

References  

001A
001A
Former segments of the Trans-Canada Highway
001A
Transport in Abbotsford, British Columbia
Transport in Chilliwack